Poland will participate in the Eurovision Song Contest 2023 in Liverpool, United Kingdom, with "Solo" performed by Blanka. The Polish broadcaster  (TVP) organised the national final  in order to select the Polish entry.

Background 

Between 2005 and 2011, Poland failed to qualify from the semi-final round six out of seven years with only their  entry, "For Life" performed by Isis Gee, managing to take the nation to the final during that period. In , Ochman brought Poland back to the final, eventually finishing 12th with his song "River".

The Polish national broadcaster,  (TVP), broadcasts the event within Poland and organises the selection process for the nation's entry. The broadcaster opted to select the Polish entry for the 2022 contest during a national selection show titled , a process that was continued for their 2023 entry.

Before Eurovision

Tu bije serce Europy! Wybieramy hit na Eurowizję! 
 ("The heart of Europe beats here! We choose the hit for Eurovision!") was the national final organised by TVP in order to select the Polish entry for the Eurovision Song Contest 2023. The national final was watched, according to the Average Minute Rating, by 1.5 million people with a market share of 10.6%. According to Nielsen Audience Measurement, the show attracted 1.1 million viewers, while the Real Viewership Model reported 1.4 million viewers for the show.

Competing entries 
TVP opened a submission period for interested artists and songwriters to submit their entries between 19 September 2022 and 10 February 2023. The broadcaster received 300 submissions at the closing of the deadline. It was recommended for the artists to take part in the process of composing or songwriting of their song. A five-member selection committee consisting of a representative of TVP, a radio personality, a music expert, a journalist and a representative of the Polish Musicians Union selected ten entries from the received submissions to compete in the national final, while TVP reserved the right to select the final finalist (a wildcard) from outside of the submissions. The chosen competing entries were announced on 15 February 2023 during the TVP2 programme Pytanie na śniadanie. Among the competing artists is Alicja Szemplińska, who was due to represent Poland in the Eurovision Song Contest 2020 before its cancellation. The competing artists were required to submit a promotional video for their song to TVP by 20 February 2023.

Final 
The final took place on 26 February 2023. Ten entries competed in the national final, with the winner determined by a 50/50 combination of votes from a five-member professional jury and a public vote. In the event of a tie, the tie would be decided in favour of the jury. The jury that voted during the show consisted of chairperson Edyta Górniak (singer, runner-up of the Eurovision Song Contest 1994), Agustin Egurrola (choreographer),  (music journalist and artistic director, commentator of the Eurovision Song Contest in Poland) and Marcin Kusy (President of the Polish Radio Program I).

Controversies

Ahlena's participation 
On 23 February, Janusz Daszczyński, journalist and former chairman of TVP, expressed outrage regarding the participation of the song "Booty" by Ahlena in the selection on his Facebook account, claiming that selecting such a song for the national final was "scandalous", and that the lyrics of the song were obscene and not fit for being broadcast on national television. The topic was discussed during a programme council meeting held on the same day, where the people involved in the organisation of the selection were asked to clarify why such a song was selected, which was answered with a statement emphasizing that an independent committee selected by TVP, over which the broadcaster had no influence, was chosen to pick the lineup. TVP asked Ahlena to change the lyrics of the song for the final, which she complied with.

Accusations of rigging and lack of transparency 

During the jury voting sequence, booing could be heard throughout the audience, as well as screams of "Rigged" right after the winner was announced. Following the final of the selection, accusations were made against Polish broadcaster TVP and the jury of alleged deals with winner Blanka. In addition, viewers accused the jury of intentionally lowering the score of the audience's favourite, Jann, in favor of the eventual winner, which caused demands for the results to be annulled. It was alleged that Blanka and Allan Krupa, son of Edyta Górniak (chairman of the jury), knew each other personally. In response to the allegations, Krupa claimed that prior to the final he did not know the singer privately, thinking she was one of the dancers, which caused more outrage at TVP for poor management of the green room. It was later confirmed by Górniak herself that Blanka is in fact, Allan's girlfriend (given her tiktok where she calls Blanka her son's "beloved") which sparked even more outrage. Also criticised was the amount of impact the jury had on the result, as the viewers allegedly cast three times as many votes for the winner of the televote, Jann. The votes of jury member Agustin Egurrola were also questioned due to the fact that Blanka used dancers from the dance group Volt, owned by Egurrola, in her performance, leading to allegations of cronyism. It was later noted that TVP Rozrywka had published an article which claimed to be published two hours before the selection began, to which the broadcaster responded to by saying that the publisher of the website had started working on an article about the Polish representative prior to the show, which caused the content management system to state the time of the creation of the article, instead of the actual publication. Due to public pressure, the televoting ranking was revealed a day after the final.

Through his personal Instagram profile, runner-up Jann appealed to his fans to stop hate speech and support Blanka during the preparations for the Eurovision Song Contest, as well as in the competition itself. Following the final, two petitions appeared in which Internet users demanded a change of representative. The two petitions gained over 87,000 votes combined. Five major Polish fan portals, namely Eurowizja.org jointly with the Polish OGAE fanclub, Dziennik Eurowizyjny, Dobry Wieczór Europo, Misja Eurowizja and Let's Talk About ESC, petitioned TVP for the publication of the number of votes cast for individual participants, which, together with the issue of the allegations of fixing the results, would be examined by an "independent external company". The media also protested the lack of transparency in the presentation of the results. An official appeal was sent to TVP on 2 March, urging the broadcaster to respond on the matter. TVP issued a statement on 9 March, claiming that it "complied with the voting rules in accordance with the regulations" and that the voting was "supervised by a notary present during the final".

At Eurovision 
According to Eurovision rules, all nations with the exceptions of the host country and the "Big Five" (France, Germany, Italy, Spain and the United Kingdom) are required to qualify from one of two semi-finals in order to compete for the final; the top ten countries from each semi-final progress to the final. The European Broadcasting Union (EBU) split up the competing countries into six different pots based on voting patterns from previous contests, with countries with favourable voting histories put into the same pot. On 31 January 2023, an allocation draw was held, which placed each country into one of the two semi-finals, and determined which half of the show they would perform in. Poland has been placed into the second semi-final, to be held on 11 May 2023, and has been scheduled to perform in the second half of the show.

References 

Countries in the Eurovision Song Contest 2023
2023
Eurovision